Godmonster of Indian Flats is a 1973 American Western horror film written and directed by Fredric Hobbs, and starring Christopher Brooks, E. Kerrigan Prescott, Karen Ingenthron and Stuart Lancaster. Set in a mining and "Old West" tourism community in northern Nevada, the plot depicts the accidental creation of a giant sheep monster that terrorizes the town, as well as a plot about race relations in the 1970s American West.

The film received little to no theatrical release, but has seen multiple home video (VHS, DVD, video on-demand and Blu-ray disc) runs by genre film distributors in the 45 years since its production.

Plot
In an old mine outside of Reno, Nevada, local rancher Eddie discovers a large mutated sheep embryo. Anthropologist Prof. Clemens, along with his assistant Mariposa, take the embryo to his laboratory. Clemens reveals that he came to the area to investigate the mines due to their role in a local legend about a large monster that haunted the area. Clemens discovers that the mine where the monster was found gives off phosphorus vapors which may have caused the mutation. He puts the embryo into an incubation chamber, where it grows into an eight-foot-tall mutant sheep monster.

Meanwhile, in town, a wealthy Black man named Barnstable attempts to purchase some real estate for mining development, but is prevented from doing so by the town's tyrannical mayor, Charles Silverdale, who wants to preserve the town for "Old West" tourism. Silverdale frames Barnstable for killing a dog (who was in no danger and was actually sent to a nephew in Albuquerque) and attempts to lynch him along with some other locals, but Barnstable evades them.

The monster escapes from Clemens' lab, and starts wandering the area, where it spooks several children, scares the local population, and causes a man to blow up his own gas station. The mayor attempts to reveal the monster in a cage as the "eighth wonder of the world". The townspeople are instead incensed that the mayor has sold their land claims and push several cars, including one holding a cage that contains the Godmonster, onto a trash dump.

The caged Godmonster explodes, and Barnstable flees. The final scene shows more mutant sheep being born.

Cast
 Christopher Brooks as Barnstable
 E. Kerrigan Prescott as Prof. Clemens
 Karen Ingenthron as Mariposa
 Stuart Lancaster as Mayor Charles Silverdale
 Richard Marion as Eddie
 Peggy Browne as Mme. Alta
 Steven Kent Browne as Philip Maldove
 Robert Hirschfeld as Sheriff Gordon

Release and reception
Godmonster of Indian Flats had a small theatrical release, but was released for home video by Something Weird Video (SWV), on VHS in 1996 and DVD in 2001. It has achieved something of a cult film status, regularly reviewed by small reviewers for being "So bad it's good." Many reviewers note the strange relationship of the intertwined plots, which hardly intersect until late in the runtime, and the film's hectic final scene, which suddenly ends the film. Others have noted the film for being a well written, interesting look on race relations in the western United States in the 70s, in addition to its fun, B-movie horror elements. Jerry Renshaw of The Austin Chronicle described the film as "quite a bit more bizarre than I can describe" and "truly stupefying," describing the titular monster as "Sesame Street's Snuffleupagus with Joe Camel's face, ratty fun-fur on its body, one very short arm and one ridiculously long, dangling arm, walking on its hind legs and tottering around the wasteland."

A 35mm print of Godmonster has been archived by the American Genre Film Archive, who scanned the print and released the film in 4K on Blu-ray disc in 2018. The film likely inspired the 2006 New Zealand horror-comedy film Black Sheep, with IMDb going so far as to label the latter a "remake".

The soundtrack to Godmonster was used in the 1996 video game Noir: A Shadowy Thriller.

See also

 Fredric Hobbs
 B movies (exploitation boom)
 Weird West

References

External links

1973 horror films
1970s English-language films